The Bombala Shire was a local government area in the Monaro region of south-eastern New South Wales, Australia. The Shire includes the town of Bombala, the villages of Delegate, Cathcart, Bibbenluke and the localities of Ando, Bungarby, Craigie, Mila, Rockton and Creewah. Bombala Shire was formed on 1 October 1977 by the amalgamation of the Municipality of Bombala and Bibbenluke Shire.

Prior to its abolition, Bombala was the fifth smallest rural shire in New South Wales, by area.

On 12 May 2016, the Bombala Shire merged with the Cooma-Monaro and the Snowy River shires to form the Snowy Monaro Regional Council.

The last mayor of Bombala Shire Council was Cr. Bob Stewart, an unaligned politician.

Council

Current composition and election method
Prior to its dissolution, the Bombala Council was composed of seven councillors elected proportionally as one entire ward. All councillors were elected for a fixed four-year term of office. The mayor was elected by the councillors at the first meeting of the council. The most recent election was held on 8 September 2012, and the last makeup of the council was as follows:

The last Council, elected in 2012 and dissolved in 2016, in order of election, was:

References 

Former local government areas of New South Wales
2016 disestablishments in Australia
1977 establishments in Australia